Youssef El Sherif (born September 14, 1978); is an Egyptian actor. His birth name is Mohamed Ismail Naji.

El Sherif began his career in 2003 in 7 Playing cards. Then he played roles in Open your eyes (2005), On low heat (2005), Agent 1001 (2005), Cinderella (2006) and Halim (2006). He has starred in The End of The World in 2006. In 2007, Director Youssef Chahine chose El Sherif to participate in his last movie before his death, Le Chaos. El Sherif played major roles in several TV series since 2011, firstly Citizen X in 2011, then Private Number in 2012, Temporary Name in 2013, The Hunter in 2014, The Devil's Game in 2015, The Caesar in 2016 and Kafr Delhab in 2017. He returned to the cinema in 2018 with the movie Sons Of Adam. then he missed three years of television drama, but he returned with first Egyptian science fiction television drama series The End in Ramadan in 2020, which Israel's Foreign Ministry condemned the series because it predicts Israel's destruction.

El Sherif collaborated with the writer Amr Samir Atef and the director Ahmed Nader Galal in several works. He collaborated with Atef in Private Number, The Hunter, The Caesar, The Devil's Game, Kafr Delhab, Sons Of Adam and The End. He collaborated with Galal in Private Number, Temporary Name, The Hunter, The Caesar, The Devil's Game, Kafr Delhab and Sons Of Adam. He is also the owner of the idea of several works like The Hunter, Kafr Delhab and The End. In 2009, El Sherif married Engy Alaa, who wrote the story of The Devil's Game. She is also the main fashion designer in most of his works.

Personal life 
His birth name is Mohamed Ismail Naji. He was born in Cairo, in September 14 1978, to a father who works in the army. He played football in the junior team of Al-Ahly, but was injured before his moving to the first team, which kept him out of the field. Then he went to work in the advertising field and graduated from the Faculty of Engineering, Ain Shams University, Department of Mechanics in 2002. In 2009, Youssef El-Sherif married the editor-in-chief of Euphoria magazine, Engy Alaa, and they have three children: the twins Abdelrahman and Abdallah as well as Jana.

Career 
In 2004, the director Sharif Sabry chose him to act for first time in 7 Playing cards and he chose an artistic name for him, "Youssef El Sherif". After that, he participated in Open your eyes, Agent 1001 and Cinderella in 2005, in which he personified the character of director Ali Badrakhan. Until the director Youssef Chahine chose him in 2007 to participate in his last movie before his death, Le Chaos. he participated in the Venice Film Festival and in the 51st session of the London International Film Festival.

Youssef El Sherif stated more than once in several television interviews that he places conditions in his business contracts by not providing "steamy scenes". He said: "I don’t feel comfortable at all, or find it to be right for me, to have ‘steamy scenes’, for example, with kissing or holding. I don't feel like it's right from my point of view, I enforce this in my life and on myself only."

Works

TV series 
 COVID-25 (2021)
 The End (2020)
 Kafr Delhab (2017)
 The Caesar (2016)
 The Devil's Game (2015)
 The Hunter (2014)
 Temporary Name (2013)
 Like Roses (2012)
 Private Number (2012)
 Citizen X (2011)
Cinderella (2006)
Agent 1001 (2005)

Films 
 Sons Of Adam (2018)
 The International Player (2009)
 Le Chaos (2007)
 The End of The Road (2006)
Halim (2006)
 Open your eyes (2005)
On low heat (2005)
 7 Playing cards (2004)

Writer 
 COVID-25 (2021) (idea)
 The End (2020) (idea)
 Sons Of Adam (2018) (idea)
 Kafr Delhab (2017) (idea)
 The Caesar (2016) (idea)
 The Hunter (2014) (idea)

References

External links
 

1978 births
Living people
Male actors from Cairo
Egyptian male film actors
Egyptian male television actors
Egyptian Muslims
Ain Shams University alumni